Aanandham is a 2001 Indian Tamil-language drama film written and directed by N. Lingusamy and produced by R. B. Choudary. The film features an ensemble cast including Mammootty, Murali, Abbas, Devayani, Rambha, Sneha, Delhi Ganesh and Srividya. Arthur A. Wilson handled cinematography, while S. A. Rajkumar composed the film's score and soundtrack. The film opened on 25 May 2001 to positive reviews, and became one of the highest grossing Tamil films of the year. It was remade in Telugu as Sankranti (2005) .

Plot 

Thirupathisamy owns a provisional store and is the eldest among four brothers, and all live together in a home along with their parents. Thirupathi is widely respected by everyone in the family and was responsible for bringing back their family to a good state after financial troubles a few years back. He marries Bharathi, who is responsible and kind. Madhavan is the second son in the family who assists Thirupathi in managing their provisional store. He is innocent and marries his relative Renuka, but she is short-tempered and picks up quarrels often. Kannan is the third son in the family, and he goes to college where he falls for his classmate Viji. Viji is the only daughter of a rich arrogant man Thavasi. Surya is the youngest son and studies in college.

Renuka feels that only Thirupathi is respected by everyone and not Madhavan because Tirupati manages the provisional store while Madhavan just assists him. She keeps insisting Madhavan to start a separate provisional store, which he does not accept as that would separate him from his brothers. Thavasi learns of Viji's love towards Kannan and warns him to forget her. Kannan gets a job and leaves to Delhi as he does not want to marry Viji against her father's wishes.

One day, Renuka begins a quarrel at home saying that Thirupathi has a separate savings account in the bank and takes money from the account without the knowledge of other family members. Thirupathi feels bad hearing this. Suddenly, Renuka and Madhavan's daughter faints and is rushed to hospital. It is revealed that the child was suffering from a serious disease which only Thirupati knew before, and he was saving money to meet out the medical expenses without informing others, as they will worry if they get to know about the child's disease. Renuka realises her mistake knowing this and apologises to Thirupathi for her harsh behaviour towards him and Bharathi.

Later, they start a rice mill. Thirupathi learns of Kannan's love towards Viji and goes to meet Thavasi with a marriage proposal. Thavasi agrees for the wedding, but on a condition that Kannan should stay along with Viji in his home as he does not want to send his daughter to another home after wedding. Thirupathi agrees to the condition but does not inform this to Kannan as he will not agree. On the day of marriage, everyone insults Bharathi for not having a child for many years and everyone learns this except Kannan and leaves the house and Kannan learns of the condition, cancels the wedding, and comes back to his home to meet his family members. Following him, Viji also comes, asking him to marry her against her father's wishes.

Thirupathi convinces the couple that if they get married without Thavasi's permission, then it will be a big blow to Thavasi's status in society, and they should not be the reason behind that. He also convinces Viji to leave to her home immediately before anyone could know about this. When they step out of the home, they see Thavasi with a group of men to attack Thirupathi's family. But he has overheard Thirupathi's conversation with Viji, realises his good nature, and agrees for their wedding. Finally, Kannan and Viji get married happily, and Viji lives along with everyone in a joint family in Thirupathi's home.

Cast 

 Mammootty as Thirupathisamy, eldest son of the family
 Murali as Madhavan, second son
 Abbas as Kannan, third son
 Shyam Ganesh as Surya, youngest son
 Devayani as Bharathi, Thirupathi's wife
 Rambha as Renuka, Madhavan's wife
 Sneha as Viji, Kannan's love interest
 Delhi Ganesh as the four brothers' father
 Srividya as Ranganayagi, the four brothers' mother
 Vijayakumar as Thavasi, Viji's father
 Sashikumar Subramani as Srinivasan, Renuka's younger brother
 Poonam Singar as Susheela
 Periyar Dasan as Accountant
 Sethu Vinayagam as Susheela's father
 Bava Lakshmanan as Grocery stall manager
Ilavarasu
 Besant Ravi

Production 

The director Linguswamy revealed that the film was inspired by moments in his life and through a series of incidents his mother had narrated to him. Thus when director Rajakumaran convinced R. B. Choudary to give Linguswamy an opportunity, he narrated the stories and he found the producer had found them highly appealing. The director had previously assisted Vikraman in Vaanathaippola, another family drama on brothers. Linguswamy originally wanted to title the project, Thirupathi Brothers, which he later went on to name his production house.

Ramya Krishnan was initially signed on to play heroine but Mammooty cast his doubts over her involvement after the pair had fallen out on the sets of a previous Malayalam film, and she was subsequently replaced by Soundarya. Devayani was supposed to feature as Murali's pair in the film, but the actor was reluctant as Devayani had appeared as his sister in another film in the same period, Kannukku Kannaga (2000). After Soundarya opted out, Devayani was given the role of Mammooty's pair. Tarun was initially supposed to play the fourth brother in the film and make his acting debut in Tamil cinema, but the role was later altered and Shyam Ganesh was cast.

Shooting was held at locations in Chennai, Ooty and Mettupalayam among other places. The team faced criticism after litter, including chicken bones, were left on the ground following a shoot sequence held at the Kamakshi temple, Kancheepuram. Subsequently, the government intervened and prevented any further shoots to take place at temples.

Soundtrack 
The soundtrack was composed by S. A. Rajkumar.

Release and reception 
Aanandham opened to positive reviews. Malini Mannath of Chennai Online noted that "it is a promising work from the debutant director", but was mildly critical of its similarities to Vaanathaippola. Ananda Vikatan rated the film 44 out of 100. Abbas' performance in the film was praised by critics. The film won the Filmfare Award for Best Film – Tamil, and the Cinema Express Award for Best Film – Tamil. Aanandham also won in two categories the Tamil Nadu State Film Awards: Third Best Film and Best Actress for Sneha, who was also recognised for this film alongside her work in Virumbugiren and Punnagai Desam. Gowri Ramnarayan, writing for The Hindu, also listed the film amongst the best of 2001.

Box office 
The film was both a commercial and critical success. It was one of the biggest hits of Mammootty in Tamil cinema and also one of the highest grossing Tamil films of the year.

Other versions 
A Telugu remake was released in 2005 as Sankranti. A TV series inspired by Aanandham, titled Pandian Stores, premiered in 2018.

References

External links 

2000s Tamil-language films
2001 drama films
2001 films
Films directed by N. Lingusamy
Films scored by S. A. Rajkumar
Indian drama films
Tamil films remade in other languages